Bajaeolis bertschi is a species of sea slug, specifically an aeolid nudibranch. It is a marine gastropod mollusc in the family Facelinidae.

Distribution
The holotype of this species was found at 10 m depth at Punta la Gringa, Bahía de los Ángeles, on the Gulf of California coast of Mexico. Additional specimens used in the original description were from nearby Isla de Corona and from Islas Perlas, Bahía de Panama, Panama. It has also been reported from Northern Peru.

References

Facelinidae
Gastropods described in 1986